Lingulodinium is a genus of dinoflagellates belonging to the family Gonyaulacaceae.

The genus has cosmopolitan distribution.

Species:

Lingulodinium hemicystum 
Lingulodinium polyedra

References

Gonyaulacales
Dinoflagellate genera